Thorsten Becker (born 13 May 1980) is a German footballer, who in 1992 moved from Fortuna Schlangen to SC Paderborn and has played in the club's first-team squad from 2001 to 2009. He helped Paderborn gain promotion to the second level of the Bundesliga in the 2004–05 season. He suffered a knee injury in late 2005 which resulted in a long-term absence from the club.

After he retired from playing football, Becker became a coach and joined Paderborn's under-19 team as co-manager in June 2016.

References

1980 births
Living people
German footballers
SC Paderborn 07 players
2. Bundesliga players
Association football defenders